Mariana Andrade Costa, also known as Mari Paraíba (born ) is a Brazilian female volleyball player. She is part of the Brazil women's national volleyball team. On club level she played for Osasco Voleibol Clube (2001–06), EC Pinheiros (2006-07) and Minas Tênis Clube (2011–12, 2015–16).

Clubs
  Finasa Osasco (2004–2006)
  Esporte Clube Pinheiros (2006–2007)
  São Caetano (2007–2008)
  Mackenzie (2008–2009)
  São Caetano (2009–2010)
  Macaé (2010–2011)
  Minas Tênis Clube (2011–2012)
  Hinode Barueri  (2013–2014)
  Vôlei Bauru (2014)
  Minas Tênis Clube (2014–2016)
  Voléro Zürich (2016–2017)
  Nestlé Osasco (2017–2019)
  Saugella Monza (2019–2020)
  Praia Clube (2020–2021)
  Olympiakos Piraeus (2021–2022)

Awards

Clubs
 2004–05 Brazilian Superliga –  Champion, with Finasa Osasco
 2005–06 Brazilian Superliga –  Runner-up, with Finasa Osasco
 2020–21 Brazilian Superliga –  Runner-up, with Dentil/Praia Clube
 2016–17 Swiss League –  Champion, with Voléro Zürich
 2017 FIVB Club World Championship –  Bronze medal, with Voléro Zürich

References

1986 births
Living people
Brazilian women's volleyball players
Brazilian expatriate sportspeople in Switzerland
Sportspeople from Paraíba
Volleyball players at the 2015 Pan American Games
Pan American Games medalists in volleyball
Pan American Games silver medalists for Brazil
Outside hitters
Expatriate volleyball players in Switzerland
Universiade medalists in volleyball
Universiade gold medalists for Brazil
Medalists at the 2011 Summer Universiade
Medalists at the 2015 Pan American Games